Who Killed the Prosecutor and Why? is a 1972 Italian thriller film directed by Giuseppe Vari and starring Lou Castel. The hardcore inserts were edited for some foreign markets.

Cast
 Lou Castel as Carlo
 Beba Lončar as Olga
 Adolfo Celi as Inspector Vezzi
 Massimo Serato as Uncle Fifi
 Umberto D'Orsi as Romano, Don Salvatore's lawyer
 Renato Baldini as Marshal Notarantonio
 Consalvo Dell'Arti as Superintendent Portella
 Antonio La Raina as Mauri
 Carlo Landa as Roversi
 Carla Mancini as Nightclub employee
 Renato Malavasi
 Fortunato Arena as Don Salvatore Aniello
 Domenico Maggio as Garrù

Plot
A young and reckless photographer captures accidentally in his photos the murder of a judge: he decides to blackmail the perpetrator.

References

External links

1972 films
1970s thriller films
1970s Italian-language films
Films directed by Giuseppe Vari
Italian thriller films
1970s Italian films